The Madhya Pradesh High Court is the High Court of the state of Madhya Pradesh which is located in Jabalpur. It was established as the Nagpur High Court on 2 January 1936 by Letters Patent dated 2 January 1936, issued under Section 108 the Government of India Act, 1935. This Letters Patent continued in force even after the adoption of the constitution of India on 26 January 1950 by virtue of Articles 225 & 372 thereof. The court has a sanctioned judge strength of 53.

History
The present state of Madhya Pradesh, was originally created as Central Provinces in the 19th century, as Judicial Commission's territory and was administered by the Judicial Commissioner. The Judicial Commissioner's court at Nagpur was, at that time, the highest Court of the territory. It was converted into a Governor's province in 1921, when it became entitled to a full-fledged High Court for administration of Justice.

Later, Berar, a part of Nizam's state of Hyderabad, was transferred in 1933 to the Central Province, for administration. This gave the state its new name Central Provinces and Berar. Thereafter, by virtue of Letters Patent dated 2 January 1936, issued under Section 108 of the Government of India Act, 1935, by King Emperor, George the Fifth, the Nagpur High Court was established for Central Pronvices and Berar. This Letters Patent, under which the Nagpur High Court was constituted and invested with jurisdiction, continued to remain in force even after the adoption of the constitution of India on 26 January 1950, by virtue of Articles 225 & 372 thereof.

On 1 November 1956, the new state of Madhya Pradesh was constituted under States Reorganisation Act. Subsection (1) of Section 49 of the States Re-organisation Act ordained that from the appointed day i.e., 1 November 1956, the High Court exercising jurisdiction, in relation to the existing state of Madhya Pradesh, i.e. Nagpur High Court, shall be deemed to be the  High Court for the present state of Madhya Pradesh. Thus Nagpur High Court was not abolished but by a legal fiction it became High Court for the new state of Madhya Pradesh with its seat at Jabalpur. Hon'ble the Chief Justice, vide order dated 1 November 1956 constituted temporary benches of the High Court of Madhya Pradesh at Indore and Gwalior. Later, by a Presidential Notification Dt. 28 November 1968, issued in the exercise of the powers conferred by the Subsection (2) of section 51 of the States Reorganization Act, 1956, permanent benches of the High Court of Madhya Pradesh at Indore and Gwalior were established. This state of affairs continued till 1 November 2000, when the state of Chhattisgarh was carved of the existing state of Madhya Pradesh by virtue of the provisions of the Madhya Pradesh Reorganization Act, 2000 and the High Court of Chhattisgarh was established for that state with its seat at Bilaspur. The High Court of Madhya Pradesh at Jabalpur then became High Court for the successor state of Madhya Pradesh.

Principal seat & Benches
The principal seat of the court is in Jabalpur. The court is housed in an impressive building constructed by Raja Gokul Das in 1899. The building was designed by Henry Irwin in 1886. The construction work of this building was commenced in 1886 and completed in 1889. The building was constructed in brick-lime with ornamental towers and cornices. The architecture of the building is mixed baroque and oriental. The arches as well as the bastions at the corner are ornamental. There are 25 court rooms in this building.

On 1 November 1956, two temporary benches of the High Court of Madhya Pradesh were constituted, one at Indore and the other at Gwalior. Later by a Notification, these were converted to permanent benches on 28 November 1968.

Former Chief Justices

Nagpur High Court

Madhya Pradesh High Court

See also
High Courts of India

Notes

References
 Jurisdiction and Seats of Indian High Courts
Judge strength in High Courts increased

External links
 Madhya Pradesh High Court website.

Government of Madhya Pradesh
1956 establishments in Madhya Pradesh
Courts and tribunals established in 1956
High Courts of India